Behzat Baydar (born 8 March 1901, date of death unknown) was a Turkish sailor. He competed in the Star event at the 1936 Summer Olympics.

References

External links
 

1901 births
Year of death missing
Turkish male sailors (sport)
Olympic sailors of Turkey
Sailors at the 1936 Summer Olympics – Star
Sportspeople from Istanbul